The 2015–16 Dallas Mavericks season was the 36th season of the franchise in the National Basketball Association (NBA). The Mavericks finished second in the Southwest Division and sixth in the Western Conference with a 42–40 record. The Mavs' season ended with a 1–4 first round playoff series loss to the Oklahoma City Thunder.

The Mavericks would not qualify for the playoffs again until 2020. This season also marked the final career playoff appearance of Dirk Nowitzki until his retirement in 2019.

Key dates
 June 25: The 2015 NBA draft took place at Barclays Center in Brooklyn, New York. The Mavericks selected Justin Anderson with the 21st overall pick in the draft.
 July 1: 2015 NBA free agency begins.

Draft

Standings

Conference

Division

Game log

Preseason

|-bgcolor=ffcccc
| 1
| October 6
| Denver
| 
| Charlie Villanueva (18)
| Pachulia, Villanueva (8)
| J.J. Barea (7)
| American Airlines Center17,038
| 0–1
|-bgcolor=ffcccc
| 2
| October 7
| @ Houston
| 
| John Jenkins (19)
| Samuel Dalembert (8)
| Raymond Felton (6)
| Toyota Center16,839
| 0–2
|-bgcolor=ffcccc
| 3
| October 13
| @ Oklahoma City
| 
| John Jenkins (26)
| Jeremy Evans (8)
| J.J. Barea (6)
| BOK Center17,978
| 0–3
|-bgcolor=ffcccc
| 4
| October 16
| Atlanta
| 
| John Jenkins (16)
| Salah Mejri (8)
| J.J. Barea (7)
| American Airlines Center19,315
| 0–4
|-bgcolor=ffcccc
| 5
| October 19
| @ Cleveland
| 
| John Jenkins (26)
| Salah Mejri (8)
| Raymond Felton (7)
| Quicken Loans Arena18,768
| 0–5
|-bgcolor=ffcccc
| 6
| October 21
| Phoenix
| 
| John Jenkins (22)
| Zaza Pachulia (12)
| Felton, Wilson (3)
| American Airlines Center18,247
| 0–6
|-bgcolor=ffcccc
| 7
| October 23
| @ Chicago
| 
| Dirk Nowitzki (19)
| Dwight Powell (11)
| J.J. Barea (6)
| Pinnacle Bank Arena15,297
| 0–7

Regular season

|-bgcolor=ccffcc
| 1
| October 28
| @ Phoenix
| 
| Raymond Felton (18)
| Zaza Pachulia (10)
| Deron Williams (7)
| US Airways Center18,055
| 1–0
|-bgcolor=ffcccc
| 2
| October 29
| @ L.A. Clippers
| 
| John Jenkins (17)
| Pachulia, Powell (8)
| J.J. Barea (9)
| Staples Center19,218
| 1–1

|-bgcolor=ccffcc
| 3
| November 1
| @ L.A. Lakers
| 
| Dirk Nowitzki (25)
| Zaza Pachulia (12)
| Deron Williams (8)
| Staples Center18,997
| 2–1
|-bgcolor=ffcccc
| 4
| November 3
| Toronto
| 
| Dirk Nowitzki (18)
| Dwight Powell (10)
| Devin Harris (6)
| American Airlines Center20,034
| 2–2
|-bgcolor=ffcccc
| 5
| November 5
| Charlotte
| 
| Deron Williams (15)
| Zaza Pachulia (10)
| J.J. Barea (6)
| American Airlines Center19,635
| 2–3
|-bgcolor=ccffcc
| 6
| November 7
| New Orleans
| 
| Deron Williams (19)
| Zaza Pachulia (14)
| Devin Harris (6)
| American Airlines Center20,454
| 3–3
|-bgcolor=ffcccc
| 7
| November 10
| @ New Orleans
| 
| Dirk Nowitzki (18)
| Charlie Villanueva (9)
| J.J. Barea (5)
| Smoothie King Center17,128
| 3–4
|-bgcolor=ccffcc
| 8
| November 11
| L.A. Clippers
| 
| Dirk Nowitzki (31)
| Dirk Nowitzki (11)
| J.J. Barea (7)
| American Airlines Center17,128
| 4–4
|-bgcolor=ccffcc
| 9
| November 13
| L.A. Lakers
| 
| Zaza Pachulia (18)
| Zaza Pachulia (16)
| Deron Williams (7)
| American Airlines Center20,260
| 5–4
|-bgcolor=ccffcc
| 10
| November 14
| @ Houston
| 
| Raymond Felton (23)
| Dwight Powell (9)
| J.J. Barea (8)
| Toyota Center18,231
| 6–4
|-bgcolor=ccffcc
| 11
| November 16
| @ Philadelphia
| 
| Dirk Nowitzki (21)
| Dwight Powell (8)
| Deron Williams (6)
| Wells Fargo Center11,555
| 7–4
|-bgcolor=ccffcc
| 12
| November 18
| @ Boston
| 
| Dirk Nowitzki (23)
| Zaza Pachulia (12)
| Deron Williams (6)
| TD Garden17,262
| 8–4
|-bgcolor=ccffcc
| 13
| November 20
| Utah
| 
| Deron Williams (23)
| Zaza Pachulia (12)
| Deron Williams (8)
| American Airlines Center20,028
| 9–4
|-bgcolor=ffcccc
| 14
| November 22
| @ Oklahoma City
| 
| Deron Williams (20)
| Zaza Pachulia (10)
| Pachulia, Williams (6)
| Chesapeake Energy Arena18,203
| 9–5
|- bgcolor=ffcccc
| 15
| November 24
| @ Memphis
| 
| Barea, Felton (16)
| Nowitzki, Pachulia (10)
| Barea, Matthews (4)
| FedExForum17,381
| 9–6
|- bgcolor=ffcccc
| 16
| November 25
| @ San Antonio
| 
| Wesley Matthews (15)
| Dirk Nowitzki (14)
| Deron Williams (9)
| AT&T Center18,418
| 9–7
|- bgcolor=ccffcc
| 17
| November 28
| Denver
| 
| Deron Williams (22)
| Zaza Pachulia (12)
| Matthews, Williams (4)
| American Airlines Center20,339
| 10–7
|-bgcolor=ffcccc
| 18
| November 30
| @ Sacramento
| 
| Chandler Parsons (14)
| Zaza Pachulia (10)
| Felton, Williams (7)
| Sleep Train Arena16,937
| 10–8

|-bgcolor=ccffcc
| 19
| December 1
| @ Portland
| 
| Deron Williams (30)
| Zaza Pachulia (21)
| Deron Williams (8)
| Moda Center19,393
| 11–8
|-bgcolor=ffcccc
| 20
| December 4
| Houston
| 
| Deron Williams (22)
| Zaza Pachulia (11)
| Deron Williams (6)
| American Airlines Center20,339
| 11–9
|-bgcolor=ccffcc
| 21
| December 6
| @ Washington
| 
| Wesley Matthews (36)
| Raymond Felton (10)
| Deron Williams (9)
| Verizon Center16,394
| 12–9
|-bgcolor=ccffcc
| 22
| December 7
| @ New York
| 
| Dirk Nowitzki (25)
| Zaza Pachulia (8)
| Deron Williams (7)
| Madison Square Garden19,812
| 13–9
|-bgcolor=ffcccc
| 23
| December 9
| Atlanta
| 
| Deron Williams (18)
| Zaza Pachulia (17)
| Deron Williams (6)
| American Airlines Center19,936
| 13–10
|-bgcolor=ffcccc
| 24
| December 12
| Washington
| 
| Wesley Matthews (28)
| Zaza Pachulia (12)
| Deron Williams (11)
| American Airlines Center20,088
| 13–11
|-bgcolor=ccffcc
| 25
| December 14
| Phoenix
| 
| Deron Williams (18)
| Zaza Pachulia (12)
| Felton, Nowitzki (4)
| American Airlines Center19,822
| 14–11
|-bgcolor=ffcccc
| 26
| December 16
| @ Indiana
| 
| Raymond Felton (16)
| Zaza Pachulia (14)
| Deron Williams (6)
| Bankers Life Fieldhouse14,824
| 14–12
|-bgcolor=ccffcc
| 27
| December 18
| Memphis
| 
| Dirk Nowitzki (20)
| Zaza Pachulia (18)
| Chandler Parsons (7)
| American Airlines Center20,199
| 15–12
|-bgcolor=ffcccc
| 28
| December 22
| @ Toronto
| 
| Dirk Nowitzki (20)
| Dirk Nowitzki (7)
| Deron Williams (6)
| Air Canada Centre19,800
| 15–13
|-bgcolor=ccffcc
| 29
| December 23
| @ Brooklyn
| 
| J.J. Barea (32)
| Chandler Parsons (7)
| J.J. Barea (11)
| Barclays Center15,994
| 16–13
|-bgcolor=ccffcc
| 30
| December 26
| Chicago
| 
| J.J. Barea (26)
| Zaza Pachulia (12)
| three players (5)
| American Airlines Center20,392
| 17–13
|-bgcolor=ccffcc
| 31
| December 28
| Milwaukee
| 
| Wesley Matthews (22)
| Zaza Pachulia (8)
| J.J. Barea (5)
| American Airlines Center20,300
| 18–13
|-bgcolor=ccffcc
| 32
| December 30
| Golden State
| 
| J.J. Barea (23)
| Zaza Pachulia (15)
| J.J. Barea (6)
| American Airlines Center20,494
| 19–13

|-bgcolor=ffcccc
| 33
| January 1
| @ Miami
| 
| Zaza Pachulia (14)
| Zaza Pachulia (13)
| three players (5)
| American Airlines Arena19,748
| 19–14
|-bgcolor=ffcccc
| 34
| January 2
| New Orleans
| 
| Dirk Nowitzki (24)
| Zaza Pachulia (9)
| J.J. Barea (5)
| American Airlines Center20,152
| 19–15
|-bgcolor=ccffcc
| 35
| January 5
| Sacramento
| 
| Deron Williams (25)
| Zaza Pachulia (17)
| three players (4)
| American Airlines Center20,059
| 20–15
|-bgcolor=ccffcc
| 36
| January 6
| @ New Orleans
| 
| Raymond Felton (22)
| Dwight Powell (10)
| Raymond Felton (6)
| CenturyLink Center15,255
| 21–15
|-bgcolor=ffcccc
| 37
| January 8
| @ Milwaukee
| 
| Dirk Nowitzki (20)
| Zaza Pachulia (12)
| Deron Williams (6)
| BMO Harris Bradley Center16,409
| 21–16
|-bgcolor=ccffcc
| 38
| January 10
| @ Minnesota
| 
| Dirk Nowitzki (29)
| Zaza Pachulia (11)
| Barea, Williams (4)
| Target Center14,363
| 22–16
|-bgcolor=ffcccc
| 39
| January 12
| Cleveland
| 
| Chandler Parsons (25)
| Zaza Pachulia (12)
| Deron Williams (10)
| American Airlines Center20,347
| 22–17
|-bgcolor=ffcccc
| 40
| January 13
| @ Oklahoma City
| 
| J.J Barea (18)
| Mejri, Powell (9)
| J.J Barea (6)
| Chesapeake Energy Arena18,203
| 22–18
|-bgcolor=ccffcc
| 41
| January 15
| @ Chicago
| 
| Dirk Nowitzki (21)
| Zaza Pachulia (10)
| Deron Williams (6)
| United Center22,056
| 23–18
|-bgcolor=ffcccc
| 42
| January 17
| @ San Antonio
| 
| Dwight Powell (15)
| JaVale McGee (10)
| J.J Barea (4)
| AT&T Center18,418
| 23–19
|-bgcolor=ccffcc
| 43
| January 18
| Boston
| 
| Dirk Nowitzki (31)
| Zaza Pachulia (19)
| Deron Williams (6)
| American Airlines Center19,866
| 24–19
|-bgcolor=ccffcc
| 44
| January 20
| Minnesota
| 
| Chandler Parsons (30)
| McGee, Parsons (8)
| three players (4)
| American Airlines Center19,621
| 25–19
|-bgcolor=ffcccc
| 45
| January 22
| Oklahoma City
| 
| Chandler Parsons (26)
| Zaza Pachulia (8)
| Pachulia, Williams (5)
| American Airlines Center20,284
| 25–20
|-bgcolor=ffcccc
| 46
| January 24
| @ Houston
| 
| Chandler Parsons (31)
| Salah Mejri (11)
| Deron Williams (5)
| Toyota Center18,142
| 25–21
|-bgcolor=ccffcc
| 47
| January 26
| @ L.A. Lakers
| 
| J.J. Barea (18)
| Chandler Parsons (9)
| Wesley Matthews (5)
| Staples Center18,997
| 26–21
|-bgcolor=ffcccc
| 48
| January 27
| @ Golden State
| 
| Chandler Parsons (23)
| Chandler Parsons (7)
| J.J. Barea (5)
| Oracle Arena19,596
| 26–22
|-bgcolor=ccffcc
| 49
| January 29
| Brooklyn
| 
| Chandler Parsons (19)
| Zaza Pachulia (12)
| Deron Williams (6)
| American Airlines Center20,409
| 27–22
|-bgcolor=ccffcc
| 50
| January 31
| Phoenix
| 
| Deron Williams (27)
| Zaza Pachulia (15)
| Raymond Felton (6)
| American Airlines Center20,137
| 28–22

|-bgcolor=ffcccc
| 51
| February 1
| @ Atlanta
| 
| Chandler Parsons (19)
| Zaza Pachulia (13)
| J.J. Barea (4)
| Philips Arena15,455
| 28–23
|-bgcolor=ffcccc
| 52
| February 3
| Miami
| 
| Dirk Nowitzki (28)
| Zaza Pachulia (15)
| three players (4)
| American Airlines Center20,385
| 28–24
|-bgcolor=ffcccc
| 53
| February 5
| San Antonio
| 
| Anderson, Villanueva (13)
| Dirk Nowitzki (8)
| Raymond Felton (4)
| American Airlines Center20,404
| 28–25
|-bgcolor=ccffcc
| 54
| February 6
| @ Memphis
| 
| Chandler Parsons (26)
| Chandler Parsons (8)
| Deron Williams (11)
| FedExForum18,119
| 29–25
|-bgcolor=ffcccc
| 55
| February 9
| Utah
| 
| Chandler Parsons (24)
| Zaza Pachulia (11)
| J.J. Barea (6)
| American Airlines Center19,394
| 29–26
|- align="center"
|colspan="9" bgcolor="#bbcaff"|All-Star Break
|-bgcolor=ffcccc
| 56
| February 19
| @ Orlando
| 
| Chandler Parsons (24)
| Zaza Pachulia (11)
| Deron Williams (7)
| Amway Center17,764
| 29–27
|-bgcolor=ccffcc
| 57
| February 21
| Philadelphia
| 
| Wesley Matthews (21)
| Zaza Pachulia (10)
| Deron Williams (8)
| American Airlines Center20,194
| 30–27
|-bgcolor=ffcccc
| 58
| February 24
| Oklahoma City
| 
| Dirk Nowitzki (33)
| Zaza Pachulia (10)
| Raymond Felton (9)
| American Airlines Center19,805
| 30–28
|-bgcolor=ccffcc
| 59
| February 26
| Denver
| 
| Chandler Parsons (27)
| Dirk Nowitzki (13)
| Raymond Felton (6)
| American Airlines Center20,298
| 31–28
|-bgcolor=ccffcc
| 60
| February 28
| Minnesota
| 
| Chandler Parsons (29)
| David Lee (9)
| Deron Williams (8)
| American Airlines Center20,289
| 32–28

|-bgcolor=ccffcc
| 61
| March 1
| Orlando
| 
| Wesley Matthews (21)
| Zaza Pachulia (10)
| Deron Williams (6)
| American Airlines Center19,546
| 33–28
|-bgcolor=ffcccc
| 62
| March 3
| Sacramento
| 
| Chandler Parsons (28)
| David Lee (11)
| three players (5)
| American Airlines Center19,910
| 33–29
|-bgcolor=ffcccc
| 63
| March 6
| @ Denver
| 
| Dirk Nowitzki (30)
| David Lee (12)
| Felton, Williams (5)
| Pepsi Center14,802
| 33–30
|-bgcolor=ffcccc
| 64
| March 7
| L.A. Clippers
| 
| Dirk Nowitzki (22)
| three players (8)
| Barea, Williams (4)
| American Airlines Center20,002
| 33–31
|-bgcolor=ffcccc
| 65
| March 9
| Detroit
| 
| Nowitzki, Parsons (25)
| Zaza Pachulia (13)
| Deron Williams (9)
| American Airlines Center20,249
| 33–32
|-bgcolor=ffcccc
| 66
| March 12
| Indiana
| 
| Dirk Nowitzki (30)
| Zaza Pachulia (9)
| Deron Williams (8)
| American Airlines Center20,459
| 33–33
|-bgcolor=ccffcc
| 67
| March 14
| @ Charlotte
| 
| Chandler Parsons (24)
| Dirk Nowitzki (11)
| Raymond Felton (12)
| Time Warner Cable Arena15,686
| 34–33
|-bgcolor=ffcccc
| 68
| March 16
| @ Cleveland
| 
| Lee, Nowitzki (20)
| Devin Harris (6)
| Chandler Parsons (10)
| Quicken Loans Arena20,562
| 34–34
|-bgcolor=ffcccc
| 69
| March 18
| Golden State
| 
| Dirk Nowitzki (24)
| Dirk Nowitzki (9)
| Deron Williams (7)
| American Airlines Center20,515
| 34–35
|-bgcolor=ccffcc
| 70
| March 20
| Portland
| 
| Dirk Nowitzki (40)
| Salah Mejri (14)
| Deron Williams (16)
| American Airlines Center20,351
| 35–35
|-bgcolor=ffcccc
| 71
| March 23
| @ Portland
| 
| Wesley Matthews (22)
| Salah Mejri (12)
| Deron Williams (11)
| Moda Center19,819
| 35–36
|-bgcolor=ffcccc
| 72
| March 25
| @ Golden State
| 
| Wesley Matthews (26)
| Zaza Pachulia (13)
| Barea, Lee (6)
| Oracle Arena19,596
| 35–37
|-bgcolor=ffcccc
| 73
| March 27
| @ Sacramento
| 
| Raymond Felton (15)
| Lee, Powell (6)
| Raymond Felton (5)
| Sleep Train Arena17,147
| 35–38
|-bgcolor=ccffcc
| 74
| March 28
| @ Denver
| 
| J.J. Barea (18)
| Dwight Powell (7)
| J.J. Barea (11)
| Pepsi Center14,844
| 36–38
|-bgcolor=ccffcc
| 75
| March 30
| New York
| 
| J.J. Barea (26)
| Zaza Pachulia (9)
| J.J. Barea (7)
| American Airlines Center20,435
| 37–38

|-bgcolor=ccffcc
| 76
| April 1
| @ Detroit
| 
| J.J. Barea (29)
| Zaza Pachulia (11)
| four players (3)
| The Palace of Auburn Hills19,031
| 38–38
|-bgcolor=ccffcc
| 77
| April 3
| @ Minnesota
| 
| J.J. Barea (21)
| Justin Anderson (10)
| J.J. Barea (6)
| Target Center16,117
| 39–38
|-bgcolor=ccffcc
| 78
| April 6
| Houston
| 
| J.J. Barea (27)
| David Lee (8)
| J.J. Barea (8)
| American Airlines Center20,108
| 40–38
|-bgcolor=ccffcc
| 79
| April 8
| Memphis
| 
| Dirk Nowitzki (21)
| Justin Anderson (10)
| Raymond Felton (14)
| American Airlines Center20,211
| 41–38
|-bgcolor=ffcccc
| 80
| April 10
| @ L.A. Clippers
| 
| Raymond Felton (21)
| David Lee (7)
| Raymond Felton (5)
| Staples Center19,170
| 41–39
|-bgcolor=ccffcc
| 81
| April 11
| @ Utah
| 
| Deron Williams (23)
| Dirk Nowitzki (11)
| Deron Williams (6)
| Vivint Smart Home Arena19,911
| 42–39
|-bgcolor=ffcccc
| 82
| April 13
| San Antonio
| 
| Raymond Felton (23)
| Zaza Pachulia (12)
| Deron Williams (7)
| American Airlines Center20,346
| 42–40

Playoffs

|-bgcolor=ffcccc
| 1
| April 16
| @ Oklahoma City
| 
| Dirk Nowitzki (18)
| Pachulia, Powell (6)
| Barea, Williams (3)
| Chesapeake Energy Arena18,203
| 0–1
|-bgcolor=ccffcc
| 2
| April 18
| @ Oklahoma City
| 
| Raymond Felton (21)
| Raymond Felton (11)
| Deron Williams (5)
| Chesapeake Energy Arena18,203
| 1–1
|-bgcolor=ffcccc
| 3
| April 21
| Oklahoma City
| 
| Wesley Matthews (22)
| Dirk Nowitzki (5)
| J. J. Barea (7)
| American Airlines Center20,150
| 1–2
|-bgcolor=ffcccc
| 4
| April 23
| Oklahoma City
| 
| Dirk Nowitzki (27)
| Dirk Nowitzki (8)
| Raymond Felton (8)
| American Airlines Center20,516
| 1–3
|-bgcolor=ffcccc
| 5
| April 25
| @ Oklahoma City
| 
| Dirk Nowitzki (24)
| Dwight Powell (9)
| Zaza Pachulia (9)
| Chesapeake Energy Arena18,203
| 1–4

Player statistics

Regular season
After all games.

|-
| 
| 55 || 9 || 11.8 || .406 || .265 || .800 || 2.4 || .5 || .3 || .5 || 3.8
|-
| 
| 74 || 16 || 22.5 || .446 || .385 || .771 || 2.1 || 4.1 || .4 || .0 || 10.9
|-
| 
| 30 || 2 || 8.4 || .542 || .250 || .714 || 1.8 || .1 || .2 || .3 || 2.4
|-
| 
| style=background:#0B60AD;color:white;|80 || 31 || 27.4 || .406 || .282 || .847 || 3.2 || 3.6 || .9 || .2 || 9.5
|-
| 
| 64 || 0 || 20.0 || .447 || .329 || .721 || 2.2 || 1.8 || .9 || .2 || 7.6
|-
| 
| 21 || 1 || 9.2 || .414 || .158 || .889 || 1.0 || .4 || .1 || .0 || 3.3
|-
| 
| 25 || 1 || 17.3 || style=background:#0B60AD;color:white;|.636 || .000 || .738 || 7.0 || 1.2 || .4 || .6 || 8.5
|-
| 
| 78 || style=background:#0B60AD;color:white;|78 || style=background:#0B60AD;color:white;|33.9 || .388 || .360 || .863 || 3.1 || 1.9 || style=background:#0B60AD;color:white;|1.0 || .2 || 12.5
|-
| 
| 34 || 2 || 10.9 || .575 || .000 || .500 || 3.9 || .1 || .1 || .8 || 5.1
|-
| 
| 34 || 6 || 11.7 || .628 || .000 || .587 || 3.6 || .3 || .2 || style=background:#0B60AD;color:white;|1.1 || 3.7
|-
| 
| 75 || 75 || 31.5 || .448 || .368 || .893 || 6.5 || 1.8 || .7 || .7 || style=background:#0B60AD;color:white;|18.3
|-
| 
| 76 || 69 || 26.4 || .466 || .000 || .768 || style=background:#0B60AD;color:white;|9.4 || 1.7 || .8 || .3 || 8.6
|-
| 
| 61 || 51 || 29.5 || .492 || style=background:#0B60AD;color:white;|.416 || .684 || 4.7 || 2.8 || .8 || .3 || 13.7
|-
| 
| 69 || 2 || 14.4 || .493 || .125 || .739 || 4.0 || .6 || .5 || .3 || 5.8
|-
| 
| 62 || 4 || 10.7 || .382 || .273 || style=background:#0B60AD;color:white;|.917 || 2.5 || .4 || .3 || .2 || 5.1
|-
| 
| 65 || 63 || 32.4 || .414 || .344 || .869 || 2.9 || style=background:#0B60AD;color:white;|5.8 || .9 || .2 || 14.1
|}

Playoffs
After all games.

|-
| 
| 5 || 1 || 19.0 || .459 || .333 || .643 || 4.0 || 1.4 || .8 || .6 || 9.4
|-
| 
| 4 || 2 || 25.0 || .324 || .125 || 1.000 || 1.5 || style=background:#0B60AD;color:white;|5.0 || .0 || .0 || 6.3
|-
| 
| 5 || 4 || 34.4 || .464 || .286 || .636 || 4.6 || 4.6 || 1.2 || .0 || 15.0
|-
| 
| 5 || 0 || 24.2 || .500 || .308 || .500 || 2.8 || 1.6 || .6 || .0 || 7.8
|-
| 
| 2 || 0 || 16.5 || style=background:#0B60AD;color:white;|.750 || .000 || .000 || 3.0 || .5 || .0 || .0 || 6.0
|-
| 
| 5 || 5 || style=background:#0B60AD;color:white;|34.6 || .333 || .286 || .789 || 3.6 || 1.2 || 1.2 || .0 || 13.0
|-
| 
| 2 || 0 || 7.0 || .500 || .000 || .333 || 1.5 || .0 || .5 || .0 || 2.0
|-
| 
| 4 || 1 || 19.0 || .700 || .000 || .417 || 3.3 || .3 || .8 || style=background:#0B60AD;color:white;|1.3 || 4.8
|-
| 
| 5 || 5 || 34.0 || .494 || .364 || .941 || 5.0 || 1.6 || .4 || .6 || style=background:#0B60AD;color:white;|20.4
|-
| 
| 5 || 4 || 22.4 || .375 || .000 || .882 || style=background:#0B60AD;color:white;|5.4 || 3.2 || .6 || .2 || 6.6
|-
| 
| 4 || 0 || 16.0 || .474 || .000 || .545 || 4.3 || 1.0 || .3 || .0 || 6.0
|-
| 
| 4 || 0 || 5.0 || .250 || .200 || 1.000 || .5 || .3 || .0 || .0 || 2.3
|-
| 
| 3 || 3 || 16.3 || .333 || style=background:#0B60AD;color:white;|.429 || .000 || .7 || 2.7 || .3 || .0 || 5.0
|}

Roster

Milestones
 On December 23, 2015, Dirk Nowitzki passed Shaquille O’Neal to move into sixth place on the all-time scoring list.

Transactions

Trades

Free agents

Re-signed

Additions

Subtractions

References

Dallas Mavericks seasons
Dallas Mavericks
Dallas Mavericks
Dallas Mavericks
2010s in Dallas
2015 in Texas
2016 in Texas